Marc Hilliard Fogel (born 1959) is an American schoolteacher who was arrested in August 2021 by Russian authorities for trying to enter Russia with  of medical marijuana. In June 2022, he was sentenced to 14 years in prison.

Life and career
Fogel is from Pennsylvania, United States. He attended the Indiana University of Pennsylvania. He has been a history teacher at international schools in Colombia, Malaysia, Oman, and Venezuela. He lived and worked in Russia since 2012, teaching at the Anglo-American School of Moscow.

Arrest and imprisonment
In August 2021, Fogel was entering Russia through customs at Sheremetyevo Airport when around half an ounce of medical marijuana was found in his luggage. The substance had been prescribed to him in the United States to treat chronic pain.

In June 2022, Fogel was convicted of drug trafficking and sentenced to 14 years in prison. In October 2022, he was transferred from a detention center in Moscow to a penal colony, where he will serve the remainder of his sentence.

A bipartisan group of United States senators have lobbied for the State Department to designate Fogel as wrongfully detained. In May 2022, the US State Department designated basketball player Brittney Griner as being "wrongfully detained" but so far have not done so for Fogel. Fogel's case has not generated nearly the public attention that Griner’s case garnered. Pennsylvania Senator Bob Casey has voiced his dissatisfaction with the Biden administration's handling of the case.

Fogel's family has called on Brittney Griner (who was imprisoned but released in a prisoner exchange in 2022) to speak out on his case.

References

1959 births
Living people
Schoolteachers from Pennsylvania
American people convicted of drug offenses
American people imprisoned in Russia
People convicted of cannabis offenses
American expatriates in Colombia
American expatriates in Malaysia
American expatriates in Oman
American expatriates in Russia
American expatriates in Venezuela
Cannabis in Russia
Indiana University of Pennsylvania alumni
20th-century American educators
21st-century American educators
Date of birth missing (living people)
Place of birth missing (living people)